VH1 Poland was a Polish pay television music channel from VIMN Polska. It was launched on December 1, 2005, replacing MTV Classic, another Polish MTV channel which used to broadcast mainly classic videos. VH1 Poland shows almost only music-based programs and plays a much broader range of videos than its predecessor. Many themed music programs were broadcast on a daily or weekly basis.

History

As VH1 Poland 
VH1 Poland was launched on December 1, 2005, replacing MTV Classic Poland.

From April 24, 2010, VH1 Poland ceased to operate as a 24-hour music channel and instead share space with the new Comedy Central branded channel Comedy Central Family. The new channel lined-up is more skewed towards female audiences.

On April 24, 2012, VH1 Poland started broadcasting again replacing VH1 Europe (in Poland). On June 12, 2012, VH1 Poland started broadcasting in 16:9 picture format.

On September 30, 2015, VH1 Poland began to use the current branding from VH1 Europe and UK. However, the music on those idents were changed, plus, a title of each programme were added at the start of each programme.

As a Polish subfeed of VH1 Europe 
On February 1, 2017 (at 6:00 am CET), the localised Polish feed of VH1 has been merged operations with VH1 Europe from Camden Town, London, United Kingdom, due to the programming change and informing viewers on the upper-left corner showing that Rise And Shine With VH1 will be next after the last programme on the localised Polish feed (100% Music). The last music video to be played on the localised Polish feed is "Can't Hold Us" by Macklemore & Ryan Lewis featuring Ray Dalton at 5:59 am CET. The first music video to be played when the localised Polish feed of VH1 switched its own programming to VH1 Europe's programming is "Million Reasons" by Lady Gaga. While the playlist and the on-air identity (except for the advertising bumpers) has been largely changed, the on-screen graphics are still intact. Unlike the main feed of VH1 Europe (which is commercial-free), the Polish subfeed has advertisements. The channel ended its broadcast on March 3, 2020 at 6:00 am when it was replaced with VH1 Europe.

Former Programming

Last Programming Before the Shut Down 
 Guess The Year
 Rise And Shine With VH1
 Feelgood Friday
 Late Night Love
 Huge Hits
 Total Pop Party
 Keep Calm & Wind Down
 Saturday Soundtrack
 Lazy Sunday Tunes
 We Love The: 00's
 We Love The: 10's
 It Takes Two
 The Ultimate Movie Soundtracks
 Perfect Pop From The 00's

Former (as VH1 Poland, VH1 Europe) 
100% Music(2015-2017)
A–Z
Aerobic
Beavis and Butt-Head
European Chart
Final Countdown
Party Starter
Pop Chart
Rock Your Baby (2005-2017)
South Park (2012-2019)
US Chart
VH1 Weekend
VH1 Shuffle
VH1 Pop Chart
VH1 Hits(2005-2015)
Włatcy móch

References 

Defunct television channels in Poland
Paramount International Networks
Television channels and stations established in 2005
Television channels and stations disestablished in 2020
VH1